Digitivalva heringi is a moth of the family Acrolepiidae. It is found in Croatia and the Republic of Macedonia.

The larvae feed on Inula verbascifolia aschersoniana. They mine the leaves of their host plant. The mine has the form of a large, full depth, transparent blotch. The frass is deposited in grains in dispersed groups. A single larva makes several mines. Pupation takes place outside of the mine in a whitish cocoon which is found at the leaf underside against the base of the midrib. The larvae are uniformly light green with a light brown head. They can be found at the end of May.

References

Acrolepiidae
Moths described in 1956